

Psychoactive substances
Psychoactive substances derived from genetically modified organisms.

 Cocaine
 GMO plant: Nicotiana benthamiana (a tobacco plant)
 Psilocybin
 GMO bacteria: Escherichia coli
 GMO yeast: Baker’s yeast
 THC
 GMO bacteria: Zymomonas mobilis (used to produce tequila)
 Tropane alkaloids: Hyoscyamine and scopolamine
 GMO yeast: Baker’s yeast

Precursor chemicals
Precursor chemicals derived from genetically modified organisms.

 Lysergic acid (LSD precursor)
 GMO yeast: Baker’s yeast
 Thebaine (morphine precursor)
 GMO bacteria: E. coli

See also
 List of psychoactive substances derived from artificial fungi biotransformation

References

Drug-related lists
Genetically modified organisms
Biological sources of psychoactive drugs